Grand Piquey is a village in the Gironde département, close to Bordeaux and on Arcachon Bay. It is part of the commune Lège-Cap-Ferret.

Notable residents
Jean Cocteau liked to stay in hotels in Grand Piquey with Raymond Radiguet.

References

Villages in Nouvelle-Aquitaine